Endless is the second EP by American metalcore band Unearth, released in September 2002.

Overview
Endless is the band's last original release under Eulogy Recordings before moving to Metal Blade Records for their later releases, and is the last record with drummer Mike Rudberg and bassist Chris Rybicki.  Buz McGrath and John Maggard played bass on 3 of the EP's tracks, as Chris Rybicki left the band before its completion.

The first 3 songs on this EP were recorded by Killswitch Engage guitarist Adam Dutkiewicz. The EP was re-released as a vinyl (7") by Confined Records and only contains the tracks "Endless" and "My Desire". The entire EP also appears on their 2005 compilation album Our Days of Eulogy.

The song "Endless" features a tribute the band's first record label, Endless Fight Records, during a breakdown when the phrase "endless fight" is repeatedly screamed by vocalist Trevor Phipps.  The song's lyrics also contain the phrase "winds of plague," which inspired the name of a subsequent band called Winds of Plague.

Track listing

References

2002 EPs
Unearth albums
Eulogy Recordings albums
Albums produced by Adam Dutkiewicz